was a Japanese voice actor. He was best known for providing the voice of Totoro. He died 15 days before his 79th birthday due to partial ischemic heart disease.

Notable voice roles

Anime
Moomin and New Moomin (Moominpappa)
Gregory Horror Show (Mummy Papa)

Films
Dōbutsu Takarajima (Ossan)
Pikachu's Rescue Adventure (Kabigon/Snorlax)
Pink: Water Bandit, Rain Bandit (Silver)
My Neighbor Totoro (Totoro)

Video games
Virtua Fighter 2 (1994) (Shun Di)
Virtua Fighter 3 (1996) (Shun Di)
Gregory Horror Show: Soul Collector (2003) (Mummy Papa)

Dubbing roles
The Empire Strikes Back (Yoda)
Return of the Jedi (Yoda)
Malcolm X (Elijah Muhammad (Al Freeman Jr.))

Notable live action roles
Lady Snowblood (Matsuemon)
Tampopo (Restaurant owner)
Hanzo the Razor: The Snare (Tanbaya the merchant)

See also
Voice acting in Japan
Japanese voice actors

References

External links
 
81 Produce

1925 births
2004 deaths
Japanese male voice actors